Ernest Joseph "E. J." Nemeth is an indoor American football quarterback who is currently a free agent. He played college football at Sacred Heart University and King's College (PA). He has won the AIF championship three times, in 2010, 2013, and 2015.

Early life
Nemeth attended Notre Dame High School in Lawrence Township, New Jersey, where he graduated in 2001.

College career
Nemeth attended Sacred Heart University upon his high school graduation, continuing his football career. After two seasons with Sacred Heart, Nemeth transferred to King's College (PA) where he would use one season eligibility. After 2003, Nemeth dropped out to become a beer distributor.

Nemeth re-enrolled in college in 2010 at Towson University, but dropped out due to financial restrictions. He re-enrolled at Towson in 2013.

Professional career
In 2015, Nemeth signed with the York Capitals of American Indoor Football. Nemeth's play won him both the Offensive MVP and the League MVP in 2015. In 2019, he signed with the New York Streets. After leaving the Streets, Nemeth signed with the Atlantic City Blackjacks.

Coaching career
Nemeth was an assistant coach for the Stevenson Mustangs of Stevenson University from 2013 to 2015. In July 2015, he was named the head wrestling coach at Notre Dame High School.

References

External links
Sacred Heart bio

1983 births
Living people
Players of American football from Massachusetts
American football quarterbacks
Sacred Heart Pioneers football players
King's College Monarchs football players
Reading Express players
San Angelo Stampede Express players
Alaska Wild players
Baltimore Mariners players
Trenton Steel players
Utah Blaze players
Philadelphia Soul players
Harrisburg Stampede players
Central Penn Capitals players
Stevenson Mustangs football coaches
American wrestling coaches
High school wrestling coaches in the United States
Towson University alumni
Sportspeople from Springfield, Massachusetts
Notre Dame High School (New Jersey) alumni